Aglaia cinnamomea is a species of plant in the family Meliaceae. It is found in Papua, Indonesia and Papua New Guinea. Although it was treated as a separate species in a 1998 assessment by the IUCN Red List, other sources include it within Aglaia elliptica.

References

cinnamomea
Flora of Papuasia
Vulnerable flora of Asia
Taxonomy articles created by Polbot